The Garrano is an endangered breed of pony from northern Portugal, part of the Iberian horse family, mainly used as a pack horse, for riding, and for light farm work. An ancient breed, the Garrano has remained largely unchanged for thousands of years but is in decline due to predation and loss of interest in breeding for agricultural use.

It has many similarities with the Galician horse and the Dartmoor pony.

History

The horse is believed to be an ancient breed, with Northern Iberian Paleolithic cave paintings depicting horses with similar profiles. The similarities between the breed and the depicted animals lead to the conclusion that the breed's appearance has remained stable. There is genetic evidence that the horse originates in Celtic regions, with additional research suggesting the later introduction of males for breeding from north Europe. Through cross-breeding with the Andalusians brought over by the Spanish conquistadors and the local Sorraia horse, they produced the Galica Mountain Pony. In the 20th century, the breed was infused with Arab blood.

The breed's numbers have been depleted by wolf predation, as they are a preferred prey. They have also declined as they have become less attractive for agricultural work, as a result of which they have been crossbred with other species for meat. As of 2010, the population of Garrano was estimated at approximately 2,000, with a sex ratio of one stallion to 13 mares.

Characteristics

Members of the breed are usually bay, brown or dark chestnut in color, with a straight or concave facial profile, and stand on average . They are hardy and quick gaited breed and at one time were raced.

References

See also
Iberian horse
Garron

Horse breeds
Horse breeds originating in Portugal